Pia Fink (born 10 July 1995) is a German cross-country skier. She participated at the FIS Nordic World Ski Championships 2019.

Cross-country skiing results
All results are sourced from the International Ski Federation (FIS).

Olympic Games

World Championships

World Cup

Season standings

References

External links

1995 births
Living people
German female cross-country skiers
Cross-country skiers at the 2022 Winter Olympics
Olympic cross-country skiers of Germany
People from Münsingen, Germany
Sportspeople from Tübingen (region)